The 2021 Varsity Cup was the 14th season of the Varsity Cup, the top competition in the annual Varsity Rugby series. It was played between 4 February and 31 May 2021 and featured ten university teams.

 won promotion from the Varsity Shield in 2019.

Competition rules and information

There were ten participating university teams in the 2021 Varsity Cup. They played each other once during the pool stage, either at home or away. Teams received four points for a win and two points for a draw. Bonus points were awarded to teams that scored four or more tries in a game, as well as to teams that lost a match by seven points or less. Teams were ranked by log points, then points difference (points scored less points conceded).

The top four teams after the pool stage qualified for the semifinals, which were followed by a final.

This tournaments will take place in a secure Covid-19 bio-bubble called the FNB Varsity Cup Village, matches will be played at Tuks Stadium, the Tuks B-Field and Loftus Versfeld Stadium.

Teams

The teams that played in the 2019 Varsity Cup are:

Pool stage

Standings

The final log for the 2021 Varsity Cup was:

Matches

The following matches were played in the 2021 Varsity Cup:

Play-offs

Semi-finals

Final

References

2021
2021 in South African rugby union
2021 rugby union tournaments for clubs